The 1999 Chinese Football Super Cup (Chinese: 1999年度中国足球超霸杯赛) was the 5th Chinese Football Super Cup, contested by Chinese Jia-A League 1999 and 1999 Chinese FA Cup double winners Shandong Luneng Taishan and Chinese Jia-A League 1999 runners-up Liaoning FC. Liaoning won their first title after winning 4–2.

Match details

References 

1999 in Chinese football
1999